Fleming and John is a musical husband and wife team, Fleming McWilliams and John Mark Painter, currently living in Nashville, Tennessee, United States. 

The couple met while attending Belmont University in Nashville, and immediately began collaborating on songs. While pursuing a record contract, Painter began playing in studio sessions for artists like dc Talk, Sixpence None the Richer, Indigo Girls, Jars of Clay, Nanci Griffith, and Jewel. 

In 1994, the band recorded "Harder to Believe than Not To" for I Predict A Clone, a tribute album to Steve Taylor. The following year, the couple released their first album, Delusions of Grandeur on Universal Records.  Ben Folds, who called Fleming and John "the Carpenters of the 1990s with Led Zeppelin's rhythm section", invited them to open for his band. They continued to perform and record with Folds for many years, with both being featured on Folds' experimental album, Fear of Pop: Volume 1. 

In 1999, Fleming and John released their second album, The Way We Are, which spawned a minor hit with the single "Ugly Girl".

The duo has recorded many cover songs, including "Winter Wonderland" (to the tune of Led Zeppelin's "Misty Mountain Hop"), "Eldorado" (Electric Light Orchestra), "California Dreamin'" (the Mamas & the Papas), "Somebody to Love" (Jefferson Airplane), "After the Lovin'" (Engelbert Humperdinck). A longtime concert favorite has been Sonny & Cher's "I Got You Babe" to the tune of Zeppelin's "Black Dog".

The band has been dormant since the tour for The Way We Are finished in the late 1990s. However, they made songs available for purchase on their page on their MySpace pace, and they successfully funded a 2015 Kickstarter campaign to record a new album. Initially promised by Christmas that year, the album has still not been finished.

John and Fleming continue to run IHOF (International House of Fleming) studios and the DWEEB recording label,  blogging about their latest projects.

Discography
 Delusions of Grandeur, 1995 debut album - R.E.X. Music
 Delusions of Grandeur, 1996 debut album - remixed and released by Universal Records
 The Way We Are, 1999 album - Universal Records
 Ugly Girl / The Pearl, 1998 CD single - Universal Records

 Compilations
 I Predict a Clone, various artists, 1994 - Song: "Harder to Believe Than Not To"
 Vietnam: A Musical Retrospective, various artists, 1998 - Song: "California Dreamin'"
 Traveling Light - Songs from the 23rd Psalm, various artists, 2002 - Song: "Savior Like a Shepherd Lead Us"
 Lynne Me Your Ears, various artists, 2002 - Jeff Lynne tribute album - Song: "Eldorado"
 Volume 1, Fear of Pop (Ben Folds, William Shatner, etc.), 1998
 Music for Corporations Vol 1, Headmint, 2000
 Position Music - Artist Compilation Vol. 17 - Female Artists, Next to You

 Film soundtracks
 Hoodwinked!, 2005

References

Further reading

External links
 

Married couples
Rock music groups from Tennessee
Family musical groups
Musical groups from Nashville, Tennessee